Chilliwack station is a railway station in Chilliwack, British Columbia, Canada. The station  consists solely of a signpost and paved low-level platform located on the north side of the CN Railway tracks at Nowell Street. 

The station is served by Via Rail's The Canadian as a flag stop (48 hours advance notice required). The station is only served by westbound trains towards Vancouver. Eastbound trains call at Agassiz railway station along the CPR tracks, on the other side of the Fraser River. This split in service between Vancouver and Ashcroft is due to CN and CPR utilizing directional running through the Thompson- and Fraser Canyon.

Footnotes

External links 
Via Rail Station Description

Via Rail stations in British Columbia
Transport in Chilliwack